The Arkankergen mass murder occurred on 28 May 2012 in the Arkankergen military post in the Alakol District of Kazakhstan on the border with China, near the village of Usharal. Fifteen people were killed. A border guard, Vladislav Chelakh, initially confessed to the deed, but later retracted his confession.

Events

Killings
Arqanqergen is a border post between Kazakhstan and China. At 5 a.m. on 28 May 2012, communication with the border post was lost.  When police from a nearby post came to investigate, they discovered the charred quarters and 14 corpses, also burned; a body of a local gamekeeper was found later at a nearby house.  The bodies were subsequently identified as fourteen soldiers and one huntsman. The military post had been burned down. The bodies were identified with the help from Berlin's Charité Institute.

Investigation
Initially investigators considered a variety of causes, including a fight among the soldiers, an attack by religious extremists, and an assault by smugglers. The main version, however, was bullying.  The sole survivor, Vladislav Chelakh, was the only ethnic Russian stationed at the post and investigators eventually surmised that the 19-year-old soldier had been subjected to hazing.

Vladislav Chelakh was arrested on 5 June 2012, wearing civilian clothes and not far from the area where the killings took place a week earlier. He was found in a mountain hut, carrying a pistol, a computer, and the mobile phones of the dead soldiers. He admitted to the crime the next day. He later retracted his confession, claiming it had been obtained under pressure.

Trial
On 20 December 2012, Chelakh was charged with murder; theft; illegally obtaining and distributing of state secrets; embezzlement or extortion of weapons, ammo, explosive devices; illegal acquisition, transfer, sale, storage, transfer or carrying of weapons and explosive devices; intentional destruction or damaging of military equipment; desertion; and violation of the housing's inviolability. He was convicted and sentenced to life in prison at a penal colony, although his appeals are ongoing. He escaped execution as the country had abolished capital punishment for most crimes three years earlier.

Chelah's mother maintains that lawyers have refused to defend her son and those who agree charge $2,000 a month, so she is planning an appeal to International Court in Belgium. She described her boy as incapable of such a rampage. Chelakh's grandfather Vladimir publicly stated he thought his grandson was being scapegoated. In October 2012, Chelakh attempted suicide by hanging himself.

President Nursultan Abishuly Nazarbayev declared a day of national mourning and has ordered a special investigation of the incident. The head of the regional border patrol,  Alexey Fomin, was also arrested a month after the event for failing to report the border post communication failure.  Furthermore, local newsmen have resigned, claiming there is a large-scale cover-up.

List of victims

References

Mass murder in 2012
Massacres in 2012
Murder in Kazakhstan
May 2012 crimes
2012 in military history
2012 crimes in Kazakhstan
2010s murders in Kazakhstan
2012 murders in Asia